The Nour satellite (also spelled Noor, Persian: ماهواره نور, lit. 'Light') callsign "NOUR 02" or "NOOR 02", is an Iranian military satellite, which was launched to orbit on 8 March 2022. The Nour 2 satellite was lifted into space by the three-stage launcher Qased, or "Messenger". The satellite was placed into orbit at an altitude of 500 km. Before, the Islamic Revolutionary Guard Corps Aerospace Force (IRGCASF) launched Nour 1 satellite to space on 22 April 2020 by the three-stage launcher Qased. The Nour 1 had reached an orbit of 425 kilometers above the surface of the earth.

Satellite Launch 
On 8 March 2022, the Nour 2 satellite, callsign "NOUR 02" or "NOOR 02", the Iranian military satellite, was launched to orbit by IRGCASF. The Nour 2 satellite was lifted into space from the Shahroud spaceport by the three-stage launcher Qased, or "Messenger" which utilizes a combination of liquid and solid fuels. The satellite was placed into orbit at an altitude of 500 km after 480 seconds at a speed of 6.7 km/s. Before, on 22 April 2020, the IRGCASF launched Nour 1 satellite to space by the three-stage launcher Qased. The Nour 1 had reached an orbit of 425 kilometers above the surface of the earth.

Operation 
The Reconnaissance satellite orbits the earth once every 90 minutes, its mission will last three years.

On 10 May 2022, Iranian Minister of Communication and Information Technology, Issa Zarepour posted on his Instagram several images displaying the flat views of lands of Marvdasht in Fars Province and Khormoj in Bushehr Province in Southern Iran and a low-resolution, true-color, overhead image of the U.S. Navy's Fifth Fleet Base in Bahrain taken by the Noor-2 satellite. The minister's account was banned from Instagram hours later.

Launch reactions 

The attempts to launch were criticized by the United States, Germany and France. 

The U.S. claimed Iran will could use the same long-range ballistic technology to Intercontinental ballistic missile, launching more long-range weapons, including nuclear warheads.Iran rejected the claim by the US and described the purpose of launching satellites and missiles as civilian and defensive.

See also 

 Noor (satellite)
 List of air forces
 List of space forces

References

Satellites of Iran
Military satellites
Spacecraft launched in 2022